Old-timer or oldtimer may refer to:

Person 
 Old-timer, a person of old age
 Old-timer, a veteran
 Old-timer, an eggcorn for someone with Alzheimer's disease
 Old-Timers' Day, a US baseball tradition honouring Major League retirees

Vehicle 

 Oldtimer, a German, Dutch and Hungarian term for a vintage, antique or classic car
 Oldtimer Grand Prix, retro automobile racing in Austria
 Old timer, a specialized class of free flight model aircraft, for designs initially designed and flown before the end of 1942

Other 

 Old Timer, a brand of knives manufactured by Imperial Schrade
 Oldtimers (Pern), a group of characters in the fantasy fiction series Dragonriders of Pern
 The Oldtimers, a 1974-75 Canadian television series